Yuri Anikeev or Iurii Anikieiev (born June 11, 1983) is a Ukrainian International Grandmaster (GMI) of International and Brazilian draughts. He won the 2004 World Championship in Brazilian draughts and won the 2016 Draughts World Championship (rapid).  He has been the champion of Ukraine in International draughts and draughts-64 many times.

Anikeev was disqualified by the International Draughts Federation (IDF) from participation "in all official IDF competitions on the three years up to December 15, 2019." IDF cites breach of its code of ethics as the reason for the suspension. Akineev claims that his political views as well as his wearing a Ukrainian embroidered shirt at international tournaments are the real reason for the suspension. As a resident of Kharkiv, Akineev publicly voiced his criticism of Russia's annexation of Crimea and its invasions in Georgia and Eastern Ukraine. IDF is based in Saint Petersburg, with seven out of nine board members being Russian nationals (as of January 2017). In July, 2018 the Court of Arbitration for Sport quashed the disqualification.

World Championship

International draughts
 2007 (6 place)
 2013 (4 place)
 2017 (5 place)

Brazilian draughts
 2002 (3 place)
 2004 (1 place)
 2008 (2 place)
 2018 (2 place)

Russian draughts
 2020 (3 place)

European Championship

International draughts
 2006 (12 place)
 2008 (26 place)
 2012 (23 place)
 2014 (19 place)
 2016 (4 place)

Russian draughts
 2019 (1 place)

International tournaments
 2006: Salou Open (2 place)
 2008: Salou Open (3 place)

External links
Profile, FMJD
Profile, KNDB
2008 World Championship FMJD

References

1983 births
Living people
Ukrainian draughts players
Players of international draughts